Gold Award for Best Actress in a Supporting Role is an award given by Zee TV as part of its annual Gold Awards for Indian television series and artists, to recognize a female actor who has delivered an outstanding performance in a supporting role.

The award was first awarded in 2007 and since has been separated in two categories, Critics Award and Popular Award. Critics Award is given by the chosen jury of critics assigned to the function while Popular Award is given on the basis of public votings.

List of winners

2000s
2007 Vaishali Thakkar - Baa Bahoo Aur Baby as Praveena Thakkar
Gauri Pradhan Tejwani - Kyunki Saas Bhi Kabhi Bahu Thi as Nandini Virani 
Neena Gupta - Saat Phere...Saloni Ka Safar as Manno Bhabhi
Roshni Chopra - Kasamh Se as Pia Walia 
Tina Parekh - Kahaani Ghar Ghar Kii as Shruti Aggrawal
2008 Aruna Irani - Naaginn - Wadoo Ki Agni Pariksha as Maa saa / Triveni 
Aishwarya Narkar - Ghar Ki Lakshmi Betiyaan as Savitri Goradia 
Smita Bansal - Balika Vadhu as Sumitra Singh
 Vibha Chibber - Sapna Babul Ka...Bidaai as Kaushalya Prakashchandra Sharma
Prachi Shah - Kayamath as Premlata Under Shah
2009 Not Held

2010s
2010 Smita Bansal - Balika Vadhu as Sumitra Singh
Savita Prabhune - Pavitra Rishta as Sulochana Karanjkar
Lata Sabharwal - Yeh Rishta Kya Kehlata Hai as Rajeshwari Maheshwari
Sukirti Kandpal - Agle Janam Mohe Bitiya Hi Kijo as Siddheshwari Singh
Vaishali Thakkar - Uttaran as Damini 
2011 Smita Bansal - Balika Vadhu as Sumitra Singh
Savita Prabhune - Pavitra Rishta as Sulochana Karanjkar
Medha Jambotakar - Yeh Rishta Kya Kehlata Hai as Kaveri Singhania
Supriya Shukla - Tere Liye as Laboni Bannerjee
Vaishali Thakkar - Uttaran as Damini 
2012 Rupal Patel - Saath Nibhaana Saathiya as Kokila Modi
Tarana Raja - Bade Achhe Lagte Hain as Neha Vikram Shergill 
Neelu Vaghela - Diya Aur Baati Hum as Bhabho
Savita Prabhune - Pavitra Rishta as Sulochana Karanjkar
Rupali Ganguly - Parvarrish – Kuchh Khattee Kuchh Meethi as  Pinky Ahuja
2013 Neelu Vaghela - Diya Aur Baati Hum as Bhabho
Asha Negi - Pavitra Rishta as Purvi Manav Deshmukh
Tarana Raja - Bade Achhe Lagte Hain as Neha Vikram Shergill 
Smita Bansal - Balika Vadhu as Sumitra Singh
Manasi Salvi - Pyaar Ka Dard Hai Meetha Meetha Pyaara Pyaara as Avantika Deewan
Rupal Patel - Saath Nibhana Saathiya as Kokila Modi
2014 Neelu Vaghela - Diya Aur Baati Hum as Bhabho
Lavina Tandon - Jodha Akbar as Ruqaiyya Begum
Rupal Patel - Saath Nibhana Saathiya as Kokila Modi
Jayati Bhatia - Sasural Simar Ka as Mataji
Mihika Verma - Ye Hai Mohabbatein as Mihika Bhalla
Manasi Salvi - Pyaar Ka Dard Hai Meetha Meetha Pyaara Pyaara as Avantika Deewan
2015 Neelu Vaghela - Diya Aur Baati Hum as Bhabho
Rupal Patel - Saath Nibhana Saathiya as Kokila Modi
Jayati Bhatia - Sasural Simar Ka as Mataji
Mihika Verma - Ye Hai Mohabbatein as Mihika Bhalla
Mrunal Thakur - Kumkum Bhagya as Bulbul Arora
Supriya Shukla - Kumkum Bhagya as Sarla Arora
2016 Jayati Bhatia - Sasural Simar Ka as Mataji
 Krutika Desai Khan - Mere Angne Mein as Shanti Srivastava
Mihika Verma - Ye Hai Mohabbatein as Mihika Bhalla
Mrunal Thakur - Kumkum Bhagya as Bulbul Arora
Barkha Sengupta - Sankat Mochan Mahabali Hanumaan as Anjana
2017 Parul Chauhan - Yeh Rishta Kya Kehlata Hai as Suvarna Goenka
Prachi Shah - Ek Shringaar-Swabhiman as Sharda Solanki
Juhi Parmar - Karmaphal Daata Shani as Sandhya
Avantika Hundal - Ye Hai Mohabbatein as Mihika Bhalla
Jyoti Gauba - Piyaa Albela as Supriya Vyas
2018 Anjum Fakih - Kundali Bhagya as Shristi Arora
Ruchi Savarn - Kumkum Bhagya as Disha Singh
Parul Chauhan - Yeh Rishta Kya Kehlata Hai as Suvarna Goenka
Sudha Chandran - Naagin (season 2) as Yamini Singh Raheja
Kamya Panjabi -Shakti - Astitva Ke Ehsaas Ki as Preeto Singh
2019 Mugdha Chaphekar - Kumkum Bhagya as Prachi Arora (tied with) Anita Hassanandani - Naagin (season 3) as Vishakha aka Vish
Anjum Fakih - Kundali Bhagya as Sristi Arora
Poorva Gokhale - Tujhse Hai Raabta as Anupriya Rane
Rupal Patel - Yeh Rishtey Hain Pyaar Ke as Meenakshi Rajvansh
Pooja Banerjee - Kasautii Zindagii Kay (2018 TV series) as Nivedita Basu

References

Best Actress in a Supporting Role
Film awards for supporting actor